Second degree may refer to:

 A postgraduate degree or a professional degree in postgraduate education
 Second-degree burn
 Second-degree polynomial, in mathematics
 Second-degree murder, actual definition varies from country to country
 The second degree in Freemasonry

See also
 First degree (disambiguation)
 Third degree (disambiguation)
 Minute and second of arc, a second of arc being  of a degree